Beeville was a small town, now extinct, in Lauramie Township, near the southern border of Tippecanoe County in the U.S. state of Indiana.

History

Beeville was platted in 1884 along the Toledo, St. Louis and Western Railroad and consisted of at least 10 lots.  Though it gained some inhabitants, the town never saw much growth, and little to no trace of it remains today.

Geography 
Beeville is located at 40°13'18" North, 86°47'24" West (40.22157, -86.79009) on County Road 600 East at an elevation of approximately 796 feet.  It sits in Lauramie Township along the grade of the abandoned railroad.

References 

Former populated places in Tippecanoe County, Indiana
Former populated places in Indiana